Tollywood films of the 1980s may refer to:
Bengali films of the 1980s
Telugu films of the 1980s